Cortland at Colliers Yard is a 153 m (500 ft) tall, 50-storey residential skyscraper in the Greengate area of Salford, Greater Manchester, England. The building is part of developer Renaker's Greengate masterplan called Colliers Yard, which consists of three adjacent towers, the others being Bankside and Parkside. It was designed by OMI Architects with Denton Corker Marshall as delivery architects. As of February 2023 it is structurally topped out, the tallest tower in Salford and the sixth-tallest building in Greater Manchester.

History

Planning
The planning application was submitted to Salford City Council in November 2019, with planning approval obtained in March 2020.

Construction
Construction of Cortland at Colliers Yard commenced in 2020 and the building topped out in July 2022. The tower contains 559 build to rent apartments.

Sale to Cortland
In December 2021, the American real estate investment, development, and management company Cortland, together with Madison International Realty, bought the tower and named the project Cortland at Colliers Yard.

See also
List of tallest buildings in the United Kingdom
List of tallest buildings and structures in Greater Manchester

References

Buildings and structures in Salford
Unfinished buildings and structures